USS Elizabeth has been the name of more than one United States Navy ship, and may refer to:

, a patrol vessel in service from 1917 to 1919
, a patrol vessel commissioned in 1917 and wrecked in 1918

See also

Elizabeth